Luigi Negri (26 November 1941 – 31 December 2021) was an Italian Roman Catholic prelate, theologian, and academic.

Biography
In 1965, he graduated from the Università Cattolica del Sacro Cuore with a degree in philosophy. On 28 June 1972, he was ordained a priest by Giovanni Colombo.

On 17 March 2005, Negri was named Bishop of San Marin-Montefeldro by Pope John Paul II, succeeding . His episcopal ordination took place on 7 May in the Milan Cathedral and was led by Dionigi Tettamanzi. On 1 December 2012, he was named Archbishop of Ferrara-Comacchio by Pope Benedict XVI. On 3 March 2013, he took possession of the Archdiocese in the Ferrara Cathedral.

Negri died in Milan on 31 December 2021, at the age of 80.

Works
Persona e Stato nel pensiero di Hobbes (1988)
L'uomo e la cultura nel magistero di Giovanni Paolo II (1988)
L'antropologia di Romano Guardini (1989)
Fede e Ragione in Tommaso Campanella (1990)
Il Magistero sociale della Chiesa (1994)
False accuse alla Chiesa (1997)
Cristo destino dell'uomo (1998)
Essere prete oggi (1999)
Controstoria. Una rilettura di mille anni di vita della Chiesa (2000)
Nell'anno della Trinità (2000)
Il Mistero si fa Presenza. Meditazioni sui tempi liturgici (2000)
Cristianesimo e Senso Religioso (2001)
Ripensare la modernità (2003)
Vivere il Cristianesimo (2004)
L'insegnamento di Giovanni Paolo II (2005)
Pio IX. Attualità & Profezia (2006)
Vivere il Matrimonio (2006)
Per un umanesimo del terzo millennio. Il magistero sociale della Chiesa (2007)
Lo stupore di una vita che si rinnova. Spunti di riflessione sull'esperienza cristiana (2008)
Emergenza educativa. Che fare? (2008)
Con Galileo oltre Galileo (2009)
Perché la Chiesa ha ragione. Su vita, famiglia, educazione, Aids, demografia, sviluppo (2010)
Parole di fede ai giovani (2010)
Fede e cultura. Scritti scelti (2011)
Risorgimento e identità italiana: una questione ancora aperta (2011)
Vivere il matrimonio. Percorso di verifica per fidanzati & sposi (2012)
I Promessi Sposi nostri contemporanei (2014)
Il cammino della Chiesa. Fondamenti, storia & problemi (2015)
False accuse alla Chiesa (2016)

References

1941 births
2021 deaths
Clergy from Milan
21st-century Italian Roman Catholic archbishops
Bishops of Ferrara
Italian theologians
Università Cattolica del Sacro Cuore alumni
Academic staff of the Università Cattolica del Sacro Cuore